DNA is the fifteenth studio album by the Japanese singer Koda Kumi, released on August 22, 2018, six months after her previous studio album, AND, making it her second album of 2018.

DNA has thirteen musical tracks on the CD, four music videos on the DVD/Blu-ray, the performance of her Fanclub Tour ~AND~ at DRUM LOGOS in Fukuoka, which was performed on April 29, 2018, on the second DVD, and the behind-the-scenes of the tour and making of the album DNA on the third DVD.

Information
The album debuted at No. 2 on the Oricon Albums Charts, taking No. 3 for the week, becoming her second consecutive album to not reach the number-one spot (AND charted at #6). Kumi had held the number-one position with every studio and compilation album between 2005 and 2017, beginning with Best ~first things~ (2005) and ending with the double-album W Face (2017).

Unlike AND, which had a fun and upbeat style, DNA was made to be darker and toned down. This was most obvious in the album's artwork, in which Kumi dons more muted attire.

The album was preceded by three singles: "LIT", "HUSH" and "Never Enough". However,  "LIT" and "Never Enough" were placed on the album AND and "HUSH" was the only song placed on DNA.

The CD contained twelve new tracks, along with the previously released song "HUSH"; the first DVD and Blu-ray contained the corresponding music videos for "HUSH" and three new songs "Watch Out!! ~DNA~" (stylized as WATCH OUT!! ~DNA~), "Haircut" (stylized as HAIRCUT) and "Chances All" (stylized as CHANCES ALL). The second and third DVD were only released on the CD+3DVD fan club edition. The second DVD had her April 29 performance of her Fanclub Tour ~AND~ at DRUM LOGOS in Fukuoka, while the third DVD carried behind-the-scenes footage of the tour and the making film for DNA. Her Zepp Tokyo performance of Fanclub Tour ~AND~ would later be placed on the second DVD of her fan club edition of Live Tour 2018 ~DNA~ (2019).

Promotional advertisements
HUSH was announced on September 9, 2017, and was her second single of the three planned releases for the year of 2017 – LIT being the first and Never Enough being the third. Due to having no physical release outside of concert venues, the song failed to chart on the Oricon Singles Charts. "HUSH" was a hip-hop piece composed by Swedish musical composer and songwriter Louise Frick-Sveen, who had previously worked with South Korean group SF9 for their song "Fanfare" in July along with Albin Nordqvist. The lyrics to "HUSH" were written by Kumi and TEEDA from the group Back-On.

The song "Guess Who Is Back" (track #9) was used as the 4th theme song for the 1st season of the anime Black Clover. This made it the first time since 2012 that Kumi performed a theme song for an anime, the previous being "Go to the top" for the anime Muv-Luv Alternative: Total Eclipse.

Music videos
Along with the music video for "Hush", three new videos were created and performed for the album: "Watch Out!! ~DNA~", "Haircut" and "Chances All". The three new videos were performed in the same location, with "Haircut" being the main promotional track.

The video for "Haircut" opened with the first few seconds of the album's first track, "Introduction ~My music is designed from my DNA~". It shows Kumi with blonde hair as she makes her way to a stylist's station, where they dye her hair in rainbow colors. After she gets up, she walks behind promotional posters for the DNA album as her hair changes. In the video, she has several hairstyles, including platinum blonde pigtails with butterflies, before she unveils her current hairstyle of a blonde bob cut. Other scenes in the video include Kumi spray painting a wall while wearing neon boots and a black swimsuit. The video ends with Kumi cutting her hair with scissors, which began the video for "Watch Out!! ~DNA~".

"Watch Out!! ~DNA~" was performed in the same location, with Kumi wearing a neon yellow raincoat over a black jumpsuit. The video was predominately a dance number, with Kumi and four background dancers. "Chances All" was composed of the multiple hairstyles she wore in the video for "Haircut", with Kumi singing directly to the camera.

Short versions of all three new videos were uploaded to avex's official YouTube on August 9, 2018, to help promote the album.

Track listing

Personnel
Credits are adapted from album's liner notes

Musicians
Koda Kumi – vocals
JUN – background vocals (track 6)
Koji Tetsui – bass (track 7)
Tadashi Iwamaru – drums (track 7)
Udai Shika – cello (track 7, 11)
Shoko Oki – violin (track 7, 11)
Masaki Iehara – arranger, guitar and programming (track 11)
Yasuo Sano – drums (track 11)
Hiroo Yamaguchi – bass guitar (track 11)
BACK-ON – arranger, composer (track 9)
Hi-yunk – arranger, composer (track 3, 4, 11)
Bobby Conscious – arranger, composer (track 1)
Louise Frick-Sveen – arranger, composer (track 2)
Albin Nordqvist – arranger, composer (track 2)
Daniel Kim – arranger (track 5)
Mitsu.J – guitar (track 5)
Shinjiroh Inoue – programming and guitar (track 7)
Fredrik Thomander – composer (track 8)
Andreas Öberg – composer (track 8)
Johan Becker – composer (track 8)
Maria Marcus – arranger (track 10), composer (track 8)
Frida Molander – lyricist, music (track 10)
Anna Alerstedt – lyricist, music (track 10)
Freja Jonsson Blomberg – lyricist, music  (track 10)
Chris Wahle – composer (track 13)
Dele Ladimeji – composer (track 13)
Darby Ward – composer (track 13)
Yoshiaki Onishi – mixer
Makato Yamadoi – mixer and recorder

Production team
MAX Matsuura – executive producer
Katsumi Kuroiwa – executive producer
Shinji Hayashi – general producer
Shintaro Higuchi – executive supervisor
Takeya Ino – executive supervisor
Shingo Toguchi – advisory producer
Hideki Endo – advisory producer
Yugo Suzuki – advisory producer
Kazutaka Yagi – artist management chief
Mamiko Ohkami – artist management chief
Misaki Tanaka – artist management
Shinsuke Kubo – artist management supervisor
Hitoshi Itagaki – general artist management
Naoko Asai – artist management desk
Yoichi Takeda – artist planner
Masatoshi Uchida – A&R manager
Yu Kikuchi – A&R
Atsushi Sawamura – creative director
Miho Shirai – assistant creative director
Akihiko Oda – sales promotion manager
Kenta Tamura – sales promotion
Rie Kosuge – sales promotion
Nobutoshi Ono – A&R general manager
Yu Koiguchi – artist planner general manager
Hiromi Amano – creative supervisor
Mayumi Tokairin – A&R desk
Rumi Kasai – A&R desk
Akihito Yamanaka – tour management producer
Shinya Kato – tour management assistant
Ro Cholsik – tour management
Mio Sakai – tour management
Satoshi Arisaka – MD supervisor
Naoki Mori – MD producer
Asami Sugaya – fan club director
Azusa Horiuchi – fan club director
Taisuke Fujimoto – fan club director
Kenta Sugawara – fan club producer

Package staff
Taku Nakai – art direction & design
TISCH – photographer
Kazuhito Sugito – hair
Yayoi Tanda – make-up
Kazuyo Shinato – stylist
Akiko Akui – nailist
Yukiko Yamashita – creative coordination

Oricon Sales Chart (Japan)

References

External links
Koda Kumi official website
DNA special website

2018 albums
Avex Group albums
Koda Kumi albums